David Mercer (27 June 1928 – 8 August 1980) was an English dramatist.

Early life 

Mercer was born in Wakefield, Yorkshire, England, the son of an engine driver while his mother had been a domestic servant. Both of his grandfathers had been miners. After failing to gain entry to the local grammar school, Mercer left school at 14, worked as a laboratory technician and in the Merchant Navy before attending university. After attending courses at Wakefield Technical College he matriculated at University College, Durham to study chemistry, but eventually grew bored of this and switched to studying art at King's College Newcastle – which was then part of Durham University. Just after graduation he married Jitke Sigmund, a Czechoslovakian refugee who was studying Economics at King's. Her father had been killed by the Gestapo. With his wife, he spent a year in Paris living with emigres from Communist regimes, where he attempted to become a painter. On realising he was not cut out to be a painter, he burnt all of his canvasses and turned to writing instead.

In late 1957, now separated and living with Dilys Johnson (whom he later married), he rented a room in a flat at 10 Compayne Gardens, London NW6, that was rented, in turn, by the poet Jon Silkin from Rudolf Nassauer (a wine merchant, poet, and novelist) and his wife, Bernice Rubens, who was later recipient of the 1970 Booker Prize. The historical novelist Malcolm Macdonald, then a student at the Slade, was another of Silkin's tenants at that time. At this location, Mercer wrote a more political novel whose acerbic Northern hero, Congo Booth, was an early prototype of many disaffected-marxist heroes in his television plays. Neither novel was ever published. All three – Silkin, Mercer, and Macdonald – earned a living teaching English as a Foreign Language at the St Giles School of English in Oxford St. Mercer later taught English and Science at the Hairdressers College until his television and stage earnings enabled him to write full-time.

Writing career
Much of Mercer's television work for the BBC was made in collaboration with the director Don Taylor. This dated from the beginning of Mercer's career as a television dramatist with the play trilogy, The Generations, an attempt to depict the decline of an idealistic form of socialism over 60 years through the members of three generations of one family. This was composed of Where the Difference Begins (1961),  a tale about two brothers, one who has abandoned socialism, while the other is a Labour Party intellectual; A Climate of Fear (1962) a piece in which a scientist in Britain's nuclear programme discovers his children have joined CND; and the non-naturalistic The Birth of a Private Man (1963), an account of an activists disenchantment with protest who attempts to match left-wing attitudes with the emerging 'affluent' society. The hero of the last play dies at the Berlin Wall facing a stream of bullets from both east and west.

A Way of Living (1963) was a naturalistic piece, and dealt with the division between a young fisherman and a girl from a mining family who is about to go to university. Three other television plays from this period – A Suitable Case for Treatment (1962, film adaptation: Morgan, 1966), For Tea on Sunday (1963) and In Two Minds (1967) share a concern with madness or, in the critic John Russell Taylor's words, "social alienation expressed in terms of psychological alienation". In Two Minds, directed by Ken Loach, was remade as the feature film Family Life (1971), again directed by Loach. Morgan won a British Film Academy Award for Best Screenplay.

Mercer's first play to be written for the stage, Ride a Cock Horse, was seen in the West End in a 1965 production starring Peter O'Toole. An early work, the one-act The Governor's Lady, in which an elderly colonial governor gradually turns into a gorilla, was originally written for radio in 1960 but not performed until it was staged by the Royal Shakespeare Company (RSC) in 1965. The RSC later premiered many of Mercer's works, including his next play Belcher's Luck (1966), "a wild tragi-comedy full of Lawrentian symbolism about fertility and impotence". The RSC staged it at the Aldwych Theatre, as they did After Haggerty (1970); the father in the later is an engine driver, like Mercer's own father. The Comedy Flint (1970) was first performed at the Criterion with Michael Hordern in the lead as a parson who believes he could not have survived "without a complete lack of faith", his sermons being "a form of bewildering interior monologue",

Other plays for television broadcast in the 1960s are And Did Those Feet (1965), The Parachute (1968) and Let's Murder Vivaldi (1968) and another trilogy, comprising On the Eve of Publication (1969), The Cellar and the Almond Tree (1970) and Emma's Time (1970). The content of this body of work made John Russell Taylor regard Mercer as the most political of British dramatists of this period. Let's Murder Vivaldi, which originated in the BBC's Wednesday Play series, received a stage production at the King's Head theatre club in 1972.

In 1970, Mercer contributed White Poem – a monologue for a white Rhodesian racialist – to a Sharpeville massacre commemoration.

Mercer wrote the screenplay for the Alain Resnais film Providence (1977), in which John Gielgud portrays an elderly, dying writer. The film won a César Award.

Private life
In 1967, Mercer met a German actress, Maria Machado with whom he later had his first child, Maya Mercer.

A long-term heavy drinker, Mercer died in August 1980 after suffering a heart attack in Haifa, Israel, where he was living with his Israeli wife Dafna and their daughter Rebecca.

As fictional character 

Mercer is depicted as Malcolm Sloman in the Trevor Griffiths play The Party (1973). In 1982, The Arcata Promise, a stage adaptation of the 1974 television play, was produced by Brockman Seawell and premiered in New York in 1982, starring Brian Murray.

Works
 Where the Difference Begins (1961)
 A Climate of Fear (1962)
 Morgan, A Suitable Case for Treatment (1962)
 The Birth of a Private Man (1963)
 A Way of Living (1963)
 For Tea on Sunday (1963)
 Ride a Cock Horse (1965)
 The Governor's Lady (1965)
 And Did Those Feet (1965)
 Belcher's Luck (1966)
 In Two Minds (1967)
 Let's Murder Vivaldi (1968)
 The Parachute (1968)
 On the Eve of Publication (1969)
 The Cellar and the Almond Tree (1970)
 Emma's Time (1970)
 After Haggerty (1970)
 Flint (1970)
 The Bankrupt
 Afternoon at the Festival
 The Arcata Promise (1974)
 Duck Song (1974)
 Shooting the Chandelier (1977)
 Cousin Vladimir (1978)
 The Ragazza (1978)
 The Arcata Promise
 Find Me
 Huggy Bear – originally a short story in Jon Silkin's magazine Stand!

References

External links
Museum of Broadcast Communications - page on David Mercer

TV Cream on Mercer's 1960s television work

1928 births
1980 deaths
20th-century English dramatists and playwrights
20th-century English male writers
Alumni of King's College, Newcastle
Alumni of University College, Durham
Best British Screenplay BAFTA Award winners
English male dramatists and playwrights
People from Wakefield
20th-century screenwriters